The following outline is provided as an overview of and topical guide to Venezuela:

Venezuela – sovereign country located in northern South America. Venezuela comprises a continental mainland and numerous islands located off the Venezuelan coastline in the Caribbean Sea. The country borders Guyana to the east, Brazil to the south, and Colombia to the west. Trinidad and Tobago, Grenada, St. Lucia, Barbados, Curaçao, Bonaire, Aruba, Saint Vincent and the Grenadines and the Leeward Antilles lie just north, off the Venezuelan coast. Falling within the tropics, Venezuela sits close to the equator, in the Northern Hemisphere. A former Spanish colony, which has been an independent republic since 1821, Venezuela holds territorial disputes with Guyana, largely concerning the Essequibo area, and with Colombia concerning the Gulf of Venezuela. In 1895, after the dispute over the Guyana border flared up, it was submitted to a neutral commission, which in 1899 decided it mostly in Guyana's favour.  Today, the Bolivarian Republic of Venezuela is known widely for its petroleum industry, the environmental diversity of its territory, and its natural features. Venezuela is considered to be among the world's 17 most biodiverse countries.

General reference 

 Pronunciation:
 Common English country name:  Venezuela
 Official English country name:  The Bolivarian Republic of Venezuela
 Common endonym(s):  
 Official endonym(s):  
 Adjectival(s): Venezuela
 Demonym(s):
 Etymology: Name of Venezuela
 International rankings of Venezuela
 ISO country codes:  VE, VEN, 862
 ISO region codes:  See ISO 3166-2:VE
 Internet country code top-level domain:  .ve

Geography of Venezuela 

Geography of Venezuela
 Venezuela is: a megadiverse country
 Location:
 Northern Hemisphere
 Western Hemisphere
 Latin America
South America
 Time zone:  Venezuelan Standard Time (UTC-04:30)
 Extreme points of Venezuela
 High:  Pico Bolívar 
 Low:  Lagunillas Municipality, Zulia 
 Land boundaries: 4,993 km

  2,200 km
  2,050 km
  743 km
 Coastline:  2,800 km
 Population of Venezuela: 28,018,018 (25 September 2008)  – 42nd most populous country

 Area of Venezuela: 916,445 km2
 Atlas of Venezuela

Environment of Venezuela 

Environment of Venezuela
climate of Venezuela
 Environmental issues in Venezuela
 Protected areas of Venezuela
 National parks of Venezuela
 Wildlife of Venezuela
 Flora of Venezuela
 Fauna of Venezuela
 Birds of Venezuela
 Mammals of Venezuela

Natural geographic features of Venezuela 

 Glaciers of Venezuela
 Islands of Venezuela
 Rivers of Venezuela
 World Heritage Sites in Venezuela

Regions of Venezuela 

 Regions of Venezuela

Ecoregions of Venezuela 

 List of ecoregions in Venezuela

Administrative divisions of Venezuela 

Administrative divisions of Venezuela
 Provinces of Venezuela
 Districts of Venezuela
 Municipalities of Venezuela

Provinces of Venezuela 

 Provinces of Venezuela

Districts of Venezuela 

 Districts of Venezuela

Municipalities of Venezuela 

 Municipalities of Venezuela
Capital of Venezuela: Caracas
Cities of Venezuela

Demography of Venezuela 

 Demographics of Venezuela

Government and politics of Venezuela 

 Politics of Venezuela
Form of government: federal republic
Capital of Venezuela: Caracas
Elections in Venezuela
Political parties in Venezuela

Branches of the government of Venezuela 

 Government of Venezuela Venezuela's government has five branches.

Executive branch of the government of Venezuela 
 Head of state and Head of government: President of Venezuela, Nicolás Maduro
 Cabinet of Venezuela

Legislative branch of the government of Venezuela 

 National Assembly of Venezuela

Judicial branch of the government of Venezuela 

Court system of Venezuela
 Supreme Tribunal of Justice (Venezuela)

Citizen branch of the government of Venezuela 

 Republican Moral Council (Venezuela)

Electoral branch of the government of Venezuela 

 National Electoral Council (Venezuela)

Foreign relations of Venezuela 

Foreign relations of Venezuela
 Diplomatic missions in Venezuela
 Diplomatic missions of Venezuela

International organization membership 
The Bolivarian Republic of Venezuela is a member of:

Agency for the Prohibition of Nuclear Weapons in Latin America and the Caribbean (OPANAL)
Caribbean Community and Common Market (Caricom) (observer)
Caribbean Development Bank (CDB)
Food and Agriculture Organization (FAO)
Group of 15 (G15)
Group of 24 (G24)
Group of 77 (G77)
Inter-American Development Bank (IADB)
International Atomic Energy Agency (IAEA)
International Bank for Reconstruction and Development (IBRD)
International Chamber of Commerce (ICC)
International Civil Aviation Organization (ICAO)
International Criminal Court (ICCt)
International Criminal Police Organization (Interpol)
International Development Association (IDA)
International Federation of Red Cross and Red Crescent Societies (IFRCS)
International Finance Corporation (IFC)
International Fund for Agricultural Development (IFAD)
International Hydrographic Organization (IHO)
International Labour Organization (ILO)
International Maritime Organization (IMO)
International Mobile Satellite Organization (IMSO)
International Monetary Fund (IMF)
International Olympic Committee (IOC)
International Organization for Migration (IOM)
International Organization for Standardization (ISO)
International Red Cross and Red Crescent Movement (ICRM)
International Telecommunication Union (ITU)
International Telecommunications Satellite Organization (ITSO)

International Trade Union Confederation (ITUC)
Inter-Parliamentary Union (IPU)
Latin American Economic System (LAES)
Latin American Integration Association (LAIA)
League of Arab States (LAS) (observer)
Multilateral Investment Guarantee Agency (MIGA)
Nonaligned Movement (NAM)
Organisation for the Prohibition of Chemical Weapons (OPCW)
Organization of American States (OAS)
Organization of Petroleum Exporting Countries (OPEC)
Permanent Court of Arbitration (PCA)
Rio Group (RG)
Southern Cone Common Market (Mercosur) (associate)
Unión Latina
Union of South American Nations (UNASUR)
United Nations (UN)
United Nations Conference on Trade and Development (UNCTAD)
United Nations Educational, Scientific, and Cultural Organization (UNESCO)
United Nations High Commissioner for Refugees (UNHCR)
United Nations Industrial Development Organization (UNIDO)
Universal Postal Union (UPU)
World Confederation of Labour (WCL)
World Customs Organization (WCO)
World Federation of Trade Unions (WFTU)
World Health Organization (WHO)
World Intellectual Property Organization (WIPO)
World Meteorological Organization (WMO)
World Tourism Organization (UNWTO)
World Trade Organization (WTO)

Law and order in Venezuela 

Law of Venezuela
 Capital punishment in Venezuela
 Constitution of Venezuela
 Crime in Venezuela
 Human rights in Venezuela
 LGBT rights in Venezuela
 Law enforcement in Venezuela

Military of Venezuela 

 Military of Venezuela
 Command
Commander-in-chief:
Ministry of Defence of Venezuela
 Forces
Army of Venezuela
Navy of Venezuela
Air Force of Venezuela
Military ranks of Venezuela

Local government in Venezuela 

 Local government in Venezuela

History of Venezuela 

 History of Venezuela

History of Venezuela, by period 

 List of years in Venezuela
 Pre-Columbian period in Venezuela (Prehistory–1522)
 Colonial Venezuela (1522–1821)
 Viceroyalty of New Granada
 Captaincy General of Venezuela
 First Republic of Venezuela (5 July 1811 to 25 July 1812)
 Second Republic of Venezuela
 Venezuelan War of Independence
 Third Republic of Venezuela (1817–19)
 Gran Colombia (1821–30)
 Venezuela Department (1820)
 Venezuela Department (1824)
 Republic of Venezuela (1830–1999)
 History of Venezuela (1830–1908)
 Federal War (1859–63)
 Venezuelan crisis of 1895
 Venezuelan crisis of 1902–03
 History of Venezuela (1908–58)
 World War II
 El Trienio Adeco (1945–48)
 History of Venezuela (1948–58)
 History of Venezuela (1958–99)
 1958 Venezuelan coup d'état
 Puntofijo Pact (1958)
 El Carupanazo (1962)
 El Porteñazo (1962)
 Caracazo (1989)
 1992 Venezuelan coup d'état attempts
 Bolivarian Republic of Venezuela (1999–present)
Bolivarian Revolution
 Vargas tragedy (1999)
 2002 Venezuelan coup d'état attempt
 Venezuelan general strike of 2002–03
 2004 Venezuelan recall referendum
 Crisis in Bolivarian Venezuela 
2014–17 Venezuelan protests
 2017 Venezuelan constitutional crisis
Venezuelan presidential crisis

History of Venezuela, by region 
 Timeline of Caracas

History of Venezuela, by subject 

 History of the Venezuelan oil industry
Economic history of Venezuela

Culture of Venezuela 

Culture of Venezuela
 Cuisine of Venezuela
 Languages of Venezuela
 Media in Venezuela
 National symbols of Venezuela
 Coat of arms of Venezuela
 Flag of Venezuela
 National anthem of Venezuela
 People of Venezuela
 Prostitution in Venezuela
 Public holidays in Venezuela
 Religion in Venezuela
 Buddhism in Venezuela
 Christianity in Venezuela
 Hinduism in Venezuela
 Islam in Venezuela
 Judaism in Venezuela
 World Heritage Sites in Venezuela

Art in Venezuela 
 Cinema of Venezuela
 Literature of Venezuela
 Music of Venezuela
 Television in Venezuela

Sports in Venezuela 

 Sports in Venezuela
 The first and most important sport in Venezuela is Baseball
Football in Venezuela
Venezuela at the Olympics

Economy and infrastructure of Venezuela 

Economy of Venezuela
 Economic rank, by nominal GDP (2007): 35th (thirty-fifth)
 Agriculture in Venezuela
 Communications in Venezuela
 Internet in Venezuela
 Latin America and Caribbean Network Information Centre
 Companies of Venezuela
Currency of Venezuela: Bolívar Fuerte
ISO 4217: VEF
 Energy in Venezuela
 Energy policy of Venezuela
 Health care in Venezuela
 Mining in Venezuela
 Tourism in Venezuela
 Transport in Venezuela
 Airports in Venezuela
 Rail transport in Venezuela
 Water supply and sanitation in Venezuela
Hyperinflation in Venezuela

Education in Venezuela 

 Education in Venezuela

See also 

 Venezuela
Index of Venezuela-related articles
List of Venezuela-related topics
List of international rankings
Member state of the United Nations
Outline of geography
Outline of South America

References

External links 

 Universidad de Oriente, Venezuela materials in the Digital Library of the Caribbean

General references 
 Venezuela. The World Factbook. Central Intelligence Agency.
 Venezuela at Encyclopædia Britannica
 Venezuela from the Library of Congress Country Studies
 Venezuela Information Office

Other 
 
 

Venezuela
Venezuela
 01